AFRUCA (Africans Unite Against Child Abuse) is a UK charity, established in 2001 by Modupe Debbie Ariyo OBE, as a platform for advocating for the rights and welfare of African Children. AFRUCA was set up in response to the deaths of African children in the UK such as Damilola Taylor, Jude Akapa, and Victoria Climbie who suffered abuse. AFRUCA works both across the UK from two bases in London and Manchester, and internationally in partnership with agencies across Europe and in Africa. AFRUCA also heavily relies on the 1989 United Nation Convention on the Rights of the Child to form the basis of their work. The organisation's stance is that culture and religion should not be a reason to abuse children.

Mission
AFRUCA's mission is to promote the rights and welfare of African children.

Vision
AFRUCA’s vision is to see a world in which African Children can live free of cruelty and abuse at the hands of others.

Aims and objectives
 Raise the profile of African children in the UK, and create awareness of their needs in ways that promote a positive climate for change.
 Ensure that children are aware of the risks of abuse, know their rights, and have skills to protect themselves.
 Promote positive parenting among African parents and others who care for children.
 Increase the understanding of service providers and those with leadership roles in relation to African communities about the risks of abuse to African children, and promote the development of appropriate services, practices, and support to African families.
 Influence the development of policy and regulatory action in ways that will safeguard African children.
 Develop the leadership potential of young Africans.

Work Areas
AFRUCA has five areas they state as their main areas of work:

 Awareness raising and sensitization
 Information, education, and advisory services
 Advocacy and policy development
 Community and international development
 Support for Children and Families in Crisis

Ongoing Work in the UK
 Community Volunteering Project – London and South of England 
 Safeguarding Children from Witchcraft Branding Policy Project
 Safeguarding Child Victims of Trafficking Across London and the South of England 
 Working with Faith Organisations to Safeguard African Children
 Expert Assessments and Reports in Immigration cases
 Family Support Programme
 The Dove Project – Supporting Families Affected by Witchcraft Branding in Newham

Work in Nigeria
 AFRUCA Foundation for the Protection of the Rights of Vulnerable Children in Nigeria  Project focuses on improving the environment for children in Nigerian through the following areas:
 Trafficking in children within and across borders
 Child slavery as plantation workers, camel minders, and mine workers
 Child domestic servitude
 Use of children as soldiers
 Sexual Abuse
 Sexual exploitation
 Street Children/Aids Orphans
 Socio-cultural traditional practices that impact negatively on children

Press

Press cuttings
 BBC: We Must Change Witch Practices
 BBC: Religious Show TV Miracle Hour “Puts Lives At Risk”
 Department for Education: Safeguarding Children From Abuse Linked to Faith or Belief
 Guardian: This Care System is Creating “Written Off Children”
 Leadership: Cases of Baby Factories Worry Rights Activists
 Sussex News: Detective Inspector Cycles to London to Paris to Raise Money for AFRUCA
 Tackle Overrepresentation of African Children in Child Protection System, Government Told
 MP Hosts Summit to Tackle Violent Witchcraft Abuse
 Voice Newspaper: Stateless Children Forced into Lives of Crime and Sex Work
 The Commonwealth: Poverty Fuelling Witchcraft Hysteria
 Guardian: Slavery Claim Women to Receive Compensation from Metropolitan Police
 Voice Newspaper: African Families Devastated by too Many Children in Care (Trudy Simpson
 Voice Newspaper: Breaking the Silence on Child Witches
 Community Care: African Children in the UK Vulnerable to Exploitation and Abuse
 Voice Newspaper: Plans to Tackle Witchcraft Based Child Abuse Welcome
 Trafficked Nigerian Girls’ Stories: Equality and Human Rights Commission
 New Internationalist: Child Abuse as Cheese Sandwich
 The Zimbabwean: Child Protection for Parents

Press releases
 AFRUCA Holds 7 Days Activism against Human Trafficking in London and Manchester
 Group tasks government over rising cases of 'baby factories'
 Over-representation of African children in child protection system
AFRUCA condemns Woolwich killing
AFRUCA Wins Best Community Organisation at the African Diaspora Awards

Online videos
 At What Age Can Children Be Left Home Alone
 AFRUCA’s Child Protection Training for African Parents
 Difference Between Child Labour and Child Abuse?
 The future of AFRUCA
 AFRUCA 9th Anniversary Video
 AFRUCA Working With Faith Organisations To Safeguard African Children

References

External links
AFRUCA Head Office
AFRUCA Foundation for the Protection of the Rights of the Vulnerable Children (Nigeria)

Children's rights organizations